The Palestinian Citizenship Order 1925 was a law of Mandatory Palestine that created a Palestinian citizenship for residents of the territory of Palestine Mandate. It was announced on 24 July 1925 and came into force on 1 August 1925. The Order remained in effect until 14 May 1948, when the British withdrew from the Mandate, and Palestinian citizenship came to an end. Israel enacted a Citizenship Law in 1952, while West Bank residents came under Jordan’s nationality law.

Key terms
The law gave effect to Article 7 of the Mandate for Palestine, which stated: 

"The Administration of Palestine shall be responsible for enacting a nationality law. There shall be included in this law provisions framed so as to facilitate the acquisition of Palestinian citizenship by Jews who take up their permanent residence in Palestine." 

It also gave effect to the Treaty of Lausanne, which came into force on 6 August 1924, and stated that the Ottoman nationals who were "habitually residents" of what became Palestine "will become ipso facto" nationals of that territory. 

The Order granted Palestinian citizenship to "Turkish subjects habitually resident in the territory of Palestine upon the 1st day of August, 1925". Transjordan was specifically excluded. Under some circumstances citizenship was also conferred on some persons habitually resident abroad, as well as the children or wife of a Palestinian man. The Order contained no test based on race or religion, except that people in the non-majority race could opt out of Palestinian citizenship if they were accepted by another state in which their race was a majority. 

Ottoman citizenship arose from the Ottoman Nationality Law of 1869, which created a common Ottoman citizenship irrespective of religious or ethnic affiliation.

Under the Order, Palestinian citizenship could be acquired by:
 natural change from Ottoman to Palestinian citizenship (Part I of the Order)
 birth to a father who was a Palestine citizen himself, or birth within Palestine without acquiring the nationality of any other State (Part II of the Order)
 naturalization following a period of residence in Palestine (Part III of the Order)

Palestinian citizens had the right of abode in Palestine, but were not British subjects, and were instead considered British protected persons.

Excerpts

THE KING'S MOST EXCELLENT MAJESTY NOW THEREFORE, HIS MAJESTY -

By virtue and in exercise of the powers in his behalf by the Foreign Jurisdiction Act of 1890, or otherwise, in His Majesty vested, is pleased by and with the advice of His Privy Council to order, and it is ordered as follows:-

PART 1.

1. (1) Turkish subjects habitually resident in the territory of Palestine upon the 1st day of August 1924 shall become Palestine citizens.

(2)  Any person over eighteen years of age who by virtue of this Article becomes a Palestinian citizen may [...]

(3) Any person over eighteen years of age who by virtue of clause (1) of this Article becomes a Palestinian citizen and differs in race from the majority of the population of Palestine may in the like manner and subject to the same conditions opt for the nationality of one of the States in which the majority of the population is of the same race as the person exercising the right to opt subject to the consent of that State and he shall thereupon cease to be a Palestinian citizen.

Article 21: Definitions 

For the purpose of this Order: 

1. The expression “Palestine” includes the territories to which the mandate for Palestine applies, except such parts of the territories comprised in Palestine to the east of Jordan and the Dead Sea as were defined by Order of the High Commissioner dated the first of September 1922. 

2. The expression “Palestinian citizen” means a person who is by birth or becomes by naturalisation or otherwise a Palestinian citizen.

SCHEDULE OATH OF ALLEGIANCE

I, A.B., Swear by Almighty God that I will be Faithful and Loyal to the Government of Palestine.

See also
 Constitution of Mandatory Palestine
 History of Palestinian nationality
 Ottoman Nationality Law of 1869

References

External links
 Palestinian Citizenship Order and Regulations 1925 Official Gazette 16 September 1925 pp. 460-78
 Acquisition of Palestinian Citizenship A Survey of Palestine prepared in December 1945 and January 1946 for the Information of the Anglo-American Committee of Inquiry, Vol. I Chapter VII pp. 206-8
 Report by His Britannic Majesty's Government to the Council of The League of Nations on the Administration of Palestine and Transjordan for the Year 1925

Mandatory Palestine
Documents of Mandatory Palestine
1925 documents
1925 in law
1925 in Mandatory Palestine
Nationality law